Romaldkirk railway station was situated on the Tees Valley Railway between Barnard Castle and Middleton-in-Teesdale. It served the village of Romaldkirk. 

The line opened to passenger traffic on 12 May 1868, but Romaldkirk station had not been constructed by then. Construction was reported as being nearly completed in mid June 1869 with the station due to open in a week.

The station was host to a LNER camping coach from 1936 to 1939 and possibly one for some of 1934. 

The line and station closed to passengers on 30 November 1964 and completely on 5 April 1965.

References

Further reading

External links
Romaldkirk station at Disused Stations

Disused railway stations in County Durham
Former North Eastern Railway (UK) stations
Railway stations in Great Britain opened in 1868
Railway stations in Great Britain closed in 1964
Beeching closures in England